The Bokhara River, a watercourse that is part of the Barwon catchment within the Murray–Darling basin, is located in the South Downs region of Queensland, flowing downstream into the north–western slopes of New South Wales, Australia.  It flows through the lower Balonne floodplain.

Course and features
The river rises at the Balonne River south of Dirranbandi, within the state of Queensland, and is one of several branches of the Balonne that flows generally south–west, joined by five minor tributaries, before reaching its confluence with the Barwon River, downstream from Brewarrina. The river descends  over its  course.

The Bokhara River, from its source towards its mouth, flows past the towns of Hebel and Goodooga.  Water from the river is used by farmers to irrigate a variety of crops, including barley, wheat and cotton.

See also

References

External links
 

Rivers of New South Wales
Rivers of Queensland
South West Queensland
North West Slopes